Andrew Shearer may refer to:

 Andrew N. Shearer (born 1977), underground film-maker, journalist and punk rock musician
 Andrew Shearer (lumber merchant) (1864–1944), Canadian lumber merchant and amateur ice hockey player
 Andrew Shearer (astrophysicist) (born 1953), astrophysicist and observer of pulsars and neutron stars